The 1953 South American Championship Final was the final match to determine the winner of the 1953 South American Championship. It was held on April 1, 1953, in Estadio Nacional of Lima, Peru. 

Paraguay won the match against Brazil by a 3–2 score, winning its first continental title.

Overview
Some journalists stated that Paraguay's best moments in football were during those years. In fact, the Paraguayan side achieved some notable results such as the 5–1 win to Argentina (current South American champion by then) in July 1945.

Other good performances by the Paraguayan team had been the 3rd place in 1946 –with goalkeeper Sinforiano García (considered one of the greatest in Paraguayan football) as its most notable player–, the 2nd place in 1947 and the win over Brazil on group stage in 1949 (although the host country would thrash Paraguay 7–0 in the final).

After former player Manuel Fleitas Solich was appointed coach, Paraguay started a hard training routine with the purpose of being in the best shape for the 1953 South American tournament. Results were highly satisfactory so Paraguay crowned champion unbeaten, winning Brazil in the final and taking revenge on the 1949 final.

Route to the final

Note
Brazil and Paraguay finished tied on points so a playoff match had to be played to decide the champion.

Match details

References

1953 in Peruvian football
Paraguay national football team matches
Brazil national football team matches
Copa América finals
Sports competitions in Lima
April 1953 sports events in South America